Richard Henry Nibbs (1816–1893) was an English painter and book illustrator who specialised in marine art.

Nibbs was born in Brighton, Sussex (now East Sussex), England and educated at a school in Worthing (run by the father of watercolourist Henry Tidey). He lived in Brighton throughout his life. Nibbs initially trained as a musician and became a professional cellist with the Theatre Royal orchestra. However, a lifelong love of art combined with a natural talent for detailed observation led him to become a self-taught painter - in both oils and watercolour - particularly of marine subjects. In 1840 a substantial inheritance allowed him to devote himself full-time to art.

His marine art depicts scenes mainly off the coast of his native Sussex, France and Holland - though he also drew buildings and landscapes. He exhibited regularly at the Royal Academy, the British Institution and the Royal Society of British Artists.

Selected works

Paintings:

Low Water: Newhaven Harbour, Sussex .
HMS Vengeance at Spithead (1851).
Queen Victoria landing at the Chain Pier, Brighton (1843).
Brighton promenade, 1850.
Shipping on the Thames.
Shoreham.
Philadelphia Harbour.

Illustrated books:

Lower, Mark Anthony. The Churches of Sussex: With Historical and Archaeological Descriptions (1872)
Nibbs, R. H. Antiquities of Sussex (1872)

References

External links

Paintings by R. H. Nibbs (www.1st-art-gallery.com)
Illustrations by Nibbs (Ash Rare books)
R H Nibbs (Biog)
Profiles of notable Nibbs (Roots Web)
R H Nibbs catalogue (Brighton & Hove museums)

1816 births
1893 deaths
19th-century English painters
Artists from Brighton
English male painters
English illustrators
British landscape painters
British marine artists
English watercolourists
19th-century English male artists